Melanodrymiidae is a family of gastropods belonging to the superfamily Neomphaloidea.
This family has no subfamilies.

Genera and species 
Genera and species within the family Melanodrymiidae include:
 Leptogyra Bush, 1897
 Leptogyropsis Marshall, 1988
 Melanodrymia Hickman, 1984 - type genus
 Xyleptogyra Marshall, 1988

References 

 Steffen Kiel (2010), The Vent and Seep Biota: Aspects from Microbes to Ecosystems, Nature

External links